Estadio Deportivo is a Spanish-language sports daily newspaper published in Seville, Spain. The paper has been in circulation since 1995. It is a supplement of the daily newspaper, El Mundo.

History
Estadio Deportivo was established as a weekly newspaper in 1995. On 28 August 1996, it began to be published daily. The paper is based in Seville. The former owners of the paper were Recoletos (85%) and Grupo Prensa Ibérica (15%). In 2007, it became part of Unidad Editorial. Since 11 January 2010, Estadio Deportivo has been sold with El Mundo.

References

External links

1995 establishments in Spain
Daily newspapers published in Spain
Mass media in Seville
Newspaper supplements
Newspapers established in 1995
Spanish-language newspapers
Sports mass media in Spain
Sports newspapers
Weekly newspapers published in Spain